Pontegana Castle is a ruined castle located in the municipality of Balerna in the canton of Ticino in Switzerland.

History
The ruins of this medieval castle are located on small hill between Balerna and Chiasso in the village of Pontegana. The foundation of the castle includes Roman era sarcophagi as spolia. The remains of the walls still show the 15th-century embrasures. Between 789 and 810, Ragifrit and Ragipert de Pontegano are mentioned as owning a nearby manor house. In the 10th or 11th centuries a castle was built as a possession of the Bishop of Como. In the ten years of war between Como and Milan it was captured in 1124 by Milan. The castle was returned after the war, and expanded in 1380. In 1508 it is mentioned as castrum de Pontegana. The remains of the building were used in the 18th century as a warehouse. Between the late 12th and the early 15th century, knights of Pontegana are mentioned in contemporary documents. The castle Chapel of S. Ilario is first mentioned in 1339, but no longer exists. Since 2007, the remains of the castle have been in the possession of the Canton Ticino.

References

Cultural property of national significance in Ticino
Castles in the canton of Ticino
Ruined castles in Switzerland